Micro process engineering is the science of conducting chemical or
physical processes (unit operations) inside small volumina,
typically inside channels with diameters of less than 1 mm
(microchannels) or other structures with sub-millimeter dimensions.  
These processes are usually carried out in continuous
flow mode, as opposed to batch production, allowing a throughput
high enough to make micro process engineering a tool for chemical
production. Micro process engineering is therefore not to be confused
with microchemistry, which deals with very small overall quantities of
matter.

The subfield of micro process engineering that deals with chemical
reactions, carried out in microstructured reactors or
"microreactors", is also known as
microreaction technology.

The unique advantages of microstructured reactors or microreactors are enhanced heat transfer due to the large surface area-to-volume ratio, and enhanced
mass transfer. For example, the length scale of diffusion
processes is comparable to that of microchannels or even shorter, and efficient mixing
of reactants can be achieved during very short times (typically
milliseconds). The good heat transfer properties allow a precise
temperature control of reactions. For example, highly 
exothermic reactions 
can be conducted almost isothermally when the
microstructured reactor contains a second set of microchannels ("cooling
passage"), fluidically separated from the reaction channels ("reaction
passage"), through which a flow of cold fluid with sufficiently high
heat capacity is maintained. It is also possible to change the temperature of
microstructured reactors very rapidly to intentionally achieve a non-isothermal behaviour.

Process intensification

While the dimensions of the individual channels are small, a micro
process engineering device ("microstructured reactor") can contain many
thousands of such channels, and the overall size of a microstructured
reactor can be on the scale of meters. The objective of micro process
engineering is not primarily to miniaturize production plants,
but to increase yields and selectivities of chemical reactions, thus
reducing the cost of chemical production. This goal can be achieved by
either using chemical reactions that cannot be conducted in larger
volumina, or by running chemical reactions at parameters (temperatures,
pressures, concentrations) that are inaccessible in larger volumina due
to safety constraints. For example, the detonation of the
stoichiometric mixture of two volume unit of hydrogen gas and
one volume unit of oxygen gas does not propagate in microchannels
with a sufficiently small diameter. This property is referred to as the
"intrinsic safety" of microstructured reactors. The improvement of yields
and selectivities by using novel reactions or running reactions at more
extreme parameters is known as "process intensification".

History

Historically, micro process engineering originated around the 1980s,
when mechanical micromachining methods developed for the fabrication of
uranium isotope separation nozzles were first applied to the
manufacturing of compact heat exchangers at the 
Karlsruhe (Nuclear) Research Center.

See also
 Microreactor
 Flow chemistry

Chemical process engineering
Microtechnology